Qımılqışlaq or Kymylkyshlak or Kymylkyshlakh may refer to:
 Qımılqışlaq, Khachmaz, Azerbaijan
 Qımılqışlaq, Quba, Azerbaijan